The Hajar Mountains (The Rocky Mountains or The Stone Mountains) are the highest mountain range in the eastern part of the Arabian Peninsula, shared between northern Oman and eastern United Arab Emirates.

Al means "the", and Ḥajar means "stone" or "rock". So al-Ḥajar is named as "the stone" or "the rock".

Geology

Orography and tectonic setting 
The Hajar Mountains extend for  through the UAE and Oman. They are located on the north-east corner of the Arabian Plate, reaching from the Musandam Peninsula through to the east coast of Oman.

Continental collision is occurring at the Zagros fold and thrust belt west of the Musandam Peninsula. This collisional plate boundary transitions into a subduction zone, towards the east. Here, oceanic crust of the Arabian Plate is subducted northwards beneath Eurasia, called the Makran subduction zone.

Lithology 
The geology of the Hajar can be grouped into four major tectonostratigraphic groups. Group one are the pre-Permian basement rocks, a sedimentary sequence of clastics, carbonates and evaporites. Group two are a middle Permian to Late Cretaceous sequence of continental shelf carbonates, which were deposited unconformably above the basement. This was a major tectonic event during the late Cretaceous. This process is called obduction, where Permian to middle Cretaceous continental slope-rise (shallow to deep marine) sedimentary rocks and late Cretaceous oceanic crust (Semail ophiolite) were thrust (obducted) above the rocks from groups one and two. Lastly, group four are late Cretaceous to Miocene shallow marine and terrestrial sedimentary rocks that were deposited on top of all three previous groups.

Structures 
The high topography is around two major culminations: Jabal Akhdar and Saih Hatat, which are large scale anticlines. The Saih Hatat culmination contains eclogite in the northeast at As Sifah. These rocks were subducted to about 80 km (50 mi) depth into the mantle, and then exhumed back to the surface. This exhumation event created possibly the largest megasheath fold on Earth, the Wadi Mayh megasheath fold. The common view is that these eclogites were originally basic volcanic rocks within the leading edge of the continental crust of the Arabian Plate. This leading edge was then subducted by a NE-dipping subduction zone. However, some geologists have interpreted that these eclogites were subducted through a SW-dipping subduction zone.

The two culminations are separated by the Semail Gap. This is a prominent linear structure, trending NNE—SSW. However, it is still debated as to what this structure is. Different geologists claim that it is a left-lateral (sinistral) strike-slip fault, a normal fault, a lateral ramp, a monocline due to a blind thrust, or a fault with multiple phases of deformation.

Modern topography 
The late Cretaceous obduction event created the proto-Hajar Mountains. However, this topography subsided and shallow marine sedimentation covered the region, beginning in the Paleocene. This indicates that the present day topography formed after the late Eocene. The exact timing is debated, and various interpretations indicate the topography formed anywhere between the late Eocene through to the Miocene.

The driving forces that formed the Hajar is also debated. Many geologists relate the Zagros Collision as the reason for the uplift forming the mountains, as currently the Musandam Peninsula (northwest corner of the mountain range) is uplifting due to this collision. In addition, there is no major seismicity within the central mountains, indicating that the mountains are not currently deforming, even though the Zagros collision is. This indicates that the uplift that created the present day topography occurred in the past, possibly before the initiation of the Zagros collision, by a mechanism that is not fully understood.

Geoconservation 

Oman's geological record is extremely valuable to geologists, and needs to be preserved. It contains the most complete ophiolite on Earth, of which it is most famous for among geologists. The ophiolite sequence has spectacular pillow basalt (Geotimes pillow lava), as well as exposures of the fossil crust-mantle boundary (moho). Generally, ophiolites are obducted prior to continental collision, which highly deforms the structure of the original oceanic crust. However, because continental collision has not occurred in the Hajar, the Semail ophiolite is still intact. Oman also has one of the best exposed mega-sheath folds ever discovered, the Wadi Mayh sheath fold. Additionally, the relatively small outcrop of eclogite is important. Eclogite is rare on the Earths surface, as it is a rock that forms at high pressures deep within the crust or mantle. Geologists can learn about what is occurring in the Earths interior and tectonic processes from these rocks. There are also various fossil localities in Oman that need to be protected. There is concern in the geological community that with the development of infrastructure these rocks that contain a great deal of information will be excavated and destroyed.

Geography

Central Hajar 

The central section of the Hajar is the highest and wildest terrain in the country. Jabal Shams is the highest of the range, followed by Jebel Akhdar. The latter and the smaller Jebel Nakhl range are bounded on the east by the low Sama'il Valley (which leads northeast to Muscat).

Eastern Hajar 
East of Samail are the Eastern Hajar, which run east (much closer to the coast) to the port city of Sur, almost at the easternmost point of Oman.

Western Hajar 

The mountains to the west of Sama'il Valley, particularly those in Musandam Peninsula and the UAE, are known as the Western Hajar, also known as the "Oman proper". Since Jabal Akhdar and mountains in its vicinity are west of the valley, they may be regarded as Western Hajar.

Outlier(s) 
In the region of Tawam, which includes the adjacent settlements of Al-Buraimi and Al Ain on the border of Oman and the UAE Emirate of Abu Dhabi, lies Jebel Hafeet, which can be considered an outlier of the Hajar. Due to its proximity to the main Hajar range, it may be treated as being part of the range, sensu lato. This mountain has ridges which stretch northwards to the city of Al Ain.

Ru'us al-Jibal 

The northernmost mountains of the Hajar range are found on the Musandam Peninsula. For this reason, the phrase Ru'us al-Jibal ("Heads of the Mountains") is applied to them, or the peninsula itself. Despite being physically part of the western Hajar, they differ in geology and hydrology to the rest of the range.

Shumayliyyah 

The mountains bordering the Shamailiyyah coast on the Gulf of Oman, forming parts of the northern UAE Emirates of Sharjah, Ras Al-Khaimah and Fujairah, may also be called the Shumayliyyah. In this region is Jebel Al-Ḥeben.

Flora and fauna 

The mountains are rich in plant life compared to most of Arabia, including a number of endemic species. Fruit trees such as pomegranate and apricot are grown in the cooler valleys and in places there are rocky outcrops with little vegetation. The flora shows similarities with mountain areas of nearby Iran, as well as with areas along the Red Sea in the Horn of Africa. For example, the tree Ceratonia oreothauma is found here and also in Somalia.

A number of birds are found in the mountains including Egyptian and lappet-faced vultures (Torgos tracheliotus). Mammals include mountain gazelles (Gazella gazella) and the Arabian tahr (Arabitragus jayakari). Other endemic species include a number of geckos and lizards: Asaccus montanus, Asaccus platyrhynchus and a subspecies of Wadi Kharrar rock gecko (Pristurus gallagheri) are found only in Oman while Musandam leaf-toed gecko (Asaccus caudivolvulus), Gallagher's leaf-toed gecko (Asaccus gallagheri), Oman rock gecko (Pristurus celerrimus), Jayakar lizard (Omanosaura jayakari) and Oman blue-tailed lizard (Omanosaura cyanura) are found only in the Hajar. The endangered Arabian leopard (Panthera pardus nimr) had been recorded here, particularly in the area of Khasab in northern part of the Musandam.

Like the Ru'us al-Jibal, the area of Jebel Hafeet is noted for hosting rare flora and fauna. For example, in February 2019, an Arabian caracal was sighted here, and in March, a Blanford's fox, which has also been reported in the mountains of Ras Al-Khaimah.

Threats and preservation 
The Hajar are extensively grazed by domestic goats, camels and donkeys and the landscape has been cleared in parts for urban areas and for mining, which has damaged both vegetation and water supplies and uprooted traditional rural land management behaviours. Poaching of wildlife is another issue. The Oman government has created the Wadi Sareen Reserve and an area of Jebel Qahwan-Jebal Sebtah in the Eastern Hajar, for the protection of Arabian tahr and mountain gazelle. For visitors, there is a road into the mountains from the town of Birkat al-Mawz (on the road to Nizwa from Muscat) and a walking route through Wadi al-Muaydin to the Saiq Plateau.

Trekking and hiking 
There are 11 marked trails/routes of varying intensity (between Grade 1 to 3) and duration (between 1.5 hours to 18 hours) published by Ministry of Tourism, Oman along the Hajar range. Some areas are inaccessible, and requires special equipment, as shown in a Steve Backshall TV documentary.

See also 

 Archaeological Sites of Bat, Al-Khutm and Al-Ayn
 Gabal Hagar El Zarqa
 Hafit period
 Hatta Heritage Village
 List of tourist attractions in the United Arab Emirates
 Hills of Masirah Island
 Ras al-Jinz

References

Bibliography

External links 
 
 Hiking: The Highest Points in the UAE

 
Mountains of the Emirate of Ras Al Khaimah
Mountains of the Emirate of Fujairah
Al Hajar
Mountain ranges of the United Arab Emirates